The president of the United Nations Economic and Social Council is the presiding officer of that body.

The position voted for by members of the United Nations Economic and Social Council (ECOSOC) on a yearly basis.

Election 
The Economic and Social Council elects a new bureau, a president and four vice-presidents, at the first meeting of the new session of the council, typically in July. These officials are chosen at large from among the representatives of the council's members for one-year terms. Members of bureau hold office until their successors are elected by the council at the next session.

According to the rules of procedure of the council, the election of members to the bureau includes special regard for equitable geographic rotation among the United Nations regional groups. For instance, the presidency of the council rotates between the five regions, and along with it the vice-presidencies.

Role 
The role of president of the council involves opening and closing meetings of the body, presiding over the proceedings of the council,
steering the work of the body, maintaining order and ensuring observance of the rules of procedure at all times, and, if need be, calling emergency sessions of the body. The president also usually speaks to the press on behalf of the council.

List of presidents 
The following is a list of all presidents of the Economic and Social Council since its inception:

See also
 President of the United Nations General Assembly
 President of the United Nations Security Council

References

External links 
 Presidential profile at ECOSOC
 Charter of the United Nations - Chapter X: The Economic and Social Council

United Nations Economic and Social Council